August Liivik (until 1936 Liiver; 26 January 1903 – 3 May 1942) was an Estonian sport shooter.

He was born in Särevere Rural Municipality, Järva County. In 1927 he graduated from Tondi military school in Tallinn.

He began his shooting career in 1926. In total, he won 18 medals at ISSF World Shooting Championships.

1932–1939 he was a member of Estonian national shooting team.

Following the Soviet occupation of Estonia during World War II, Liivik was arrested by Soviet authorities on 12 August 1940. He was executed in 1942 in a prison camp in Kirov Oblast, Russian Soviet Federative Socialist Republic.

References

1903 births
1942 deaths
Estonian male sport shooters
Estonian people executed by the Soviet Union
People who died in the Gulag
People from Türi Parish
20th-century Estonian people